Jason Silas "Jase" Robertson (born August 16, 1969) is an American television personality, businessman, and professional duck hunter best known for his work on the A&E reality television show Duck Dynasty. He is the COO of Duck Commander, and co-hosts the podcast Unashamed with Phil and Al Robertson.

Childhood

Jase Robertson was born to Phil and Marsha "Kay" Robertson in Bernice, Louisiana. His parents gave him the middle name of Silas in honor of his uncle Silas Robertson, Phil's brother. Jase also has three brothers: Alan, Willie, and Jeptha. Growing up with his father as the town's Duck Commander, Jase wanted to spend as much time with him as possible, going on various hunting expeditions to strengthen their bond. Soon, Robertson developed the same passion for the sport that his dad has. From the age of eight, Robertson wanted to spend as much time in the rugged lifestyle in the woods as possible, even missing the maximum possible number of school days as allowed by Louisiana law.

Business with Duck Commander

With his brother Willie as the CEO of the business, Jase Robertson was previously the COO of Duck Commander. Robertson's job at Duck Commander was to fabricate the duck calls made by the company, fine-tune them, and to invent new ones. It takes him about two to three minutes to make one duck call. One of Jase's inventions is a duck call called the "Triple Threat", a duck call which utilizes three reeds instead of the usual two.

Duck Dynasty
Jase Robertson is one of the stars of A&E's reality show Duck Dynasty. He is portrayed as a foil for Willie Robertson, and often acts as a mischief maker. Jase said he thought that the show would never take off as a popular series. He stated in an interview with Fox News's Todd Starnes that:

I was one of the ones who said the reality show would never work...We were in the hunting world. I had this perception of reality shows that you had to have all this friction and fits of rage and four-letter words...We're pretty calm compared to that...We've got some crazy characters in our family — but I didn't think people would want to see that.

Personal life
Jase Robertson lives in West Monroe, Louisiana with his wife Missy and their three children: Reed, Cole, and Mia. He is known for avoiding work in favor of hunting and fishing, speaking "duckinese", and for his self-proclaimed frog-hunting abilities. He calls himself "a frog's worst nightmare".

References

External links

1969 births
Living people
American members of the Churches of Christ
Louisiana Republicans
Participants in American reality television series
People from Bernice, Louisiana
People from West Monroe, Louisiana
Robertson family
American chief operating officers
Christians from Louisiana